Emanuel Zanders (born July 31, 1951) was an American football offensive lineman in the National Football League for the New Orleans Saints and Chicago Bears.  He played college football at Jackson State University.

Zanders is a member of the New Orleans Saints Hall of Fame 25 Years All-Time Team. He was a Saints captain from 1976-1979. In 1979, he was voted as the Saints Offensive Lineman of the Year. Other honors Zanders received in his professional career was the Soulful Saints, Inc. Offensive Player of the Year, 1978 and the National Sports Foundation Offensive Player of the Year, 1980.

Zanders was inducted into the Jackson State University Sports Hall of Fame in 2004.

1951 births
American football offensive guards
Chicago Bears players
Living people
New Orleans Saints players
Jackson State Tigers football players
People from Demopolis, Alabama